Rogelio Gabriel Funes Mori (born 5 March 1991) is a professional footballer who plays as a forward for Liga MX club Monterrey. Born in Argentina, he represents the Mexico national team.

He began his career at River Plate before transferring to Benfica, after a brief stint in Turkey he signed with Liga MX club Monterrey in the summer of 2015 and quickly established himself as one of the league's best strikers, winning the league, two domestic cups and two CONCACAF Champions League titles and surpassing Humberto Suazo to become the club's all-time top scorer in all competitions.

His identical twin brother José Ramiro is also a footballer who played as a defender for Premier League club Everton and La Liga outfit Villarreal and for the Argentina national team.

Early life
Funes Mori was born in Mendoza, Argentina. In 2001, he moved to Arlington, Texas and attended Workman Junior High and Arlington High School where he was coached by Jeffrey Waldrop playing football with his twin brother, Ramiro. The twins' father, Miguel, played professional football in Argentina with clubs such as Independiente Rivadavia and Club Atlético Argentino in the 1980s. Funes Mori scored 40 goals in the 2008 season leading his team to District Champions and Area Finalist with a record of 24–2–1. Rogelio and Ramiro, who are identical twins, also played several seasons for the Associated Soccer Group (ASG) 91' team. His coach with ASG was Uche Okafor.

After that, Chelsea scout Jorge Alvial scouted Rogelio and Ramiro on the first day of the reality show Sueño MLS, and spoke to his parents about a future tryout at Chelsea. He participated in Sueño MLS and won the contest, therefore becoming part of FC Dallas.

Club career

River Plate
Funes Mori began his professional career with River Plate in the Argentine Primera División on 6 December 2009, on a 1–3 defeat against Vélez Sársfield. He played the last two games of that year at home against Racing Club and away to Tigre, scoring his first goal with the club in their visit to the latter.

In the traditional pre-season encounters for the big clubs in Argentina, the Torneos de Verano, he scored for River in a 3–1 victory over their rivals Boca Juniors in Mar del Plata's Copa Desafío.

On 9 May, during the 2010 Clausura tournament, he scored his first hat-trick for River Plate in a game against Racing Club. He achieved the three goals in only 24 minutes, breaking a personal 11-match streak without scoring a goal. In the last game of the tournament, the forward scored River's only goal in a 1–5 loss to Tigre at home.

In the first game of the 2010 Apertura, he scored a 90th-minute goal following an assist from Ariel Ortega to secure a 1–0 victory over Tigre. This was his third goal in three games against that team. In the third fixture, against Independiente, he scored two goals in the first half as River went on to win 3–2. The forward scored his fourth goal of the season in the 1–0 victory over Arsenal de Sarandí.

Benfica
On 10 August 2013, Funes Mori joined Benfica on a five-year contract. River Plate received €2 million from an investment group who kept a share of its economic right's, with Benfica receiving half, plus the sports rights.

On 15 September, he made his debut for Benfica B, scoring his first goal in a Benfica shirt. On 15 March, he scored four goals for the B side against Sporting Covilhã in a 4–0 win. On 9 July 2014, he was loaned to Eskişehirspor in Turkey for one year, with the option to make the move permanent for a €3.5 million fee.

Monterrey
On 12 June 2015, Funes Mori moved to Liga MX club Monterrey. He made his debut in a 3–2 friendly win over Morelia, scoring in the 91st minute. In his debut tournament he finished fourth-joint top scorer of the league with 11 goals.

On 6 August 2016, he scored his first hat-trick against León.

In December 2017, he won the Copa MX after defeating Pachuca 1–0 in a home win.

He scored his 100th goal for the club on 18 December 2019 in the Club World Cup semi-final against Premiere League club Liverpool, making it 1–1 partial at the 14th minute but culminating in a 2–1 loss. After their participation at the Club World Cup, Monterrey disputed the Apertura championship finals against América. In the second leg, he scored the tying aggregate goal in order to take the match into overtime; where the winner was determined via a penalty shootout and Monterrey ultimately won 4–2. He was included in the tournament's Best XI.

With Monterrey's victory of the 2019–20 Copa MX, they had obtained the continental treble.

International career

Argentina
Funes Mori was called up by Walter Perazzo to be part of the Argentina under-20 squad that participated in the 2011 South American Youth Championship, scoring twice.

In 2012, Funes Mori made his senior debut for Argentina during a friendly match in the Superclásico de las Américas.

Mexico
Early in 2019, Funes Mori inquired FIFA about the possibility to play for Mexico, but was deemed ineligible. In 2020, following a change of rules regarding naturalized players by FIFA, he was deemed eligible to play for Mexico and restated his interest. On 14 June 2021, Funes Mori was granted his Mexican citizenship making him eligible to play for Mexico.

On 3 July 2021, he earned his first cap with the senior national team under manager Gerardo Martino in a friendly match against Nigeria, scoring on his debut in the team's 4–0 victory.

Funes Mori participated at the 2021 Gold Cup, scoring a total of 3 times. Mexico finished runner-up after losing the final to the United States 0–1.

In October 2022, Funes Mori was named in Mexico's preliminary 31-man squad for the 2022 FIFA World Cup, and in November, he was ultimately included in the final 26-man roster.

Personal life
Funes Mori is married to Jorgelina who is the sister of former FC Dallas midfielder Mauro Díaz. His twin brother, Ramiro, is also a footballer and plays for Liga MX club Cruz Azul as a defender and played for the Argentina national team at two Copa América tournaments.

Career statistics

Club

International

Scores and results list Mexico's goal tally first.

Honours
River Plate
Primera B Nacional: 2011–12

Benfica
Primeira Liga: 2013–14
Taça de Portugal: 2013–14
Taça da Liga: 2013–14

Monterrey
Liga MX: Apertura 2019
Copa MX: Apertura 2017, 2019–20
CONCACAF Champions League: 2019, 2021

Individual
Liga MX Goal of the Tournament: 2015–16, 2018–19
Copa MX Top Scorer: Clausura 2017
Liga MX Player of the Month: January 2019
Liga MX Best XI: Apertura 2019
Liga MX All-Star: 2021
CONCACAF Gold Cup Best XI: 2021
CONCACAF Champions League Golden Ball: 2021
CONCACAF Champions League Team of the Tournament: 2021
C.F. Monterrey All Time Leading Goalscorer

References

External links
 
 
 
 

1991 births
Living people
Argentine twins
Twin sportspeople
Mexican people of Argentine descent
Sportspeople of Argentine descent
Sportspeople from Mendoza, Argentina
Argentine footballers
Mexican footballers
Association football forwards
Club Atlético River Plate footballers
S.L. Benfica B players
S.L. Benfica footballers
Eskişehirspor footballers
C.F. Monterrey players
Argentine Primera División players
Primera Nacional players
Liga Portugal 2 players
Primeira Liga players
Süper Lig players
Liga MX players
Argentina youth international footballers
Argentina under-20 international footballers
Argentina international footballers
Mexico international footballers
Dual internationalists (football)
2021 CONCACAF Gold Cup players
Argentine expatriate footballers
Argentine expatriate sportspeople in the United States
Argentine expatriate sportspeople in Mexico
Argentine expatriate sportspeople in Portugal
Argentine expatriate sportspeople in Turkey
Expatriate soccer players in the United States
Expatriate footballers in Portugal
Expatriate footballers in Turkey
Expatriate footballers in Mexico
Argentine emigrants to Mexico
Identical twins
2022 FIFA World Cup players